Vitjazianidae is a family of crustaceans belonging to the order Amphipoda.

Genera:
 Vemana Barnard, 1964 	 
 Vitjaziana Birstein and Vinogradov, 1955

References

Amphipoda